is a Japanese football player who plays for Belgian First Division A club Club Brugge.

Career
Shion Homma joined J1 League club Albirex Niigata in 2017. On July 7, 2022, he joined Belgian Pro League Club Club Brugge.

Club statistics
Updated to 1 February 2020.

References

External links

Profile at Albirex Niigata

2000 births
Living people
Association football people from Niigata Prefecture
Japanese footballers
J1 League players
J2 League players
Albirex Niigata players
Association football midfielders